Dongnae Girls' High School is a private girls high school located in Bugok-3-dong, Geumjeong-gu, Busan, South Korea.

History
Dongnae Girls' High School was founded on October 15, 1895 under the name Ilshin Girls' School (일신여학교). In June 1925, the school moved to Boksan-dong and changed its name to Dongnae Ilshin Girls' School (동래일신여학교). The school was then split into a separate middle school and high school in September 1951, and Dongnae Girls' High School was established as a private school on July 14, 2009. The current principal Moon Seong-gyu was appointed on September 1, 2015 as the school's 23rd principal.

Notable alumni

 Park Cha-jeong - Independence activist
 Gong Deok-gwi - First Lady of South Korea (1960—1962)

References

External links
  

High schools in South Korea
Schools in Busan
Educational institutions established in 1895
1895 establishments in Korea